Wairoa is a heritage-listed home and garden located in the Adelaide Hills situated at 160 Mount Barker Road between Aldgate and Stirling in South Australia. It was for over three decades the home of Marbury School.

History

The  property was purchased in 1888 by William Horn, and most of the house had been completed by the early 1890s.

Occupied by Marbury School between 1972 and 2004, the home afterwards was converted to a community title and was maintained by a group of families. The gardens have been on occasion opened to the public as part of the Australian Open Garden Scheme, and also hired out for weddings. It was put on the market in 2018 as a private dwelling.

The house and associated buildings were listed on the South Australian Heritage Register with effect from 29 June 1989.

Timeline of ownership
The property has been owned/occupied by:

References

Further reading
Library catalog entries:
 Keelan, Michael (2009) "Heritage", SA Life, vol. 6, no. 5 (May 2009), pp. 70–75 (Article about the historic garden 'Wairoa' in Aldgate owned by Kirsty and Ian Dodd and Wendy and Richard Bray. Article includes a reproduction of a watercolour by William Tibbetts [sic].)
 "Wairoa, present and past", The Advertiser, 7 July 1979, pp. 21–22
 Jones, David Sydney (1999), " 'Wairoa' preserves Victorian charm" Heritage Living, Spring 1999, pg.16)

External links
Copyright photographs:
Painting of the house and garden (Tibbits, William, 1837-1906, artist)
The House in 2010       

Adelaide Hills
Houses in South Australia
South Australian Heritage Register